Wade Hampton Pipes (July 31, 1877 – July 1, 1961) was an American architect in based in Portland, Oregon. Pipes was considered the "foremost exponent of English Cottage architecture" in the state.

Career
Pipes admired the work of English architect Sir Edwin Landseer Lutyens, and was also influenced by C. F. A. Voysey. He designed in the Arts and Crafts style. In his fifty-year career, he designed some 70 residences. Many of his works are listed on the National Register of Historic Places (NRHP). In 1926, Pipes designed and a Tudor Revival style home in Southwest Portland for his father, judge Martin L. Pipes. The house is listed on the NRHP as the Martin Luther Pipes House. He also designed houses for naturalist William L. Finley, congressman Maurice Crumpacker, and author Lewis A. McArthur.

Personal life
Pipes was born on July 31, 1877 in Independence, Oregon.

Pietro Belluschi described him as "an elegantly dressed man in English tweeds".

Pipes died on July 1, 1961, having spent his entire life in Oregon except for his period of study in England.

Education
From 1907 to 1911, Pipes studied at the Central School of Arts and Crafts in London, England.

Works on the NRHP
John M. and Elizabeth Bates House No. 1, 1837 SW Edgewood Rd, Portland 
John M. and Elizabeth Bates House No. 2, 16948 SW Bryant Rd, Lake Oswego 
John M. and Elizabeth Bates House No. 3, 16884 SW Bryant Rd, Lake Oswego
John M. and Elizabeth Bates House No. 4, 4101 South Shore Blvd, Lake Oswego
Maurice Crumpacker House, 12714 SW Iron Mountain Blvd, Portland
Marshall Dana House, 15725 SE Dana Ave, Milwaukie 
Elizabeth Ducey House, 2773 NW Westover Rd, Portland
Bertha M. and Marie A. Green House, 2610 SW Vista Ave, Portland
Dr. Noble Wiley Jones House, 2187 SW Market Street Dr, Portland 
Dr. Frank B. Kistner House, 5400 SW Hewett Blvd, Portland
Pipes Family House, 3045 NE 9th Ave, Portland
George Pipes House, 2526 St Helens Court, Portland 
Martin Luther Pipes House, 2675 SW Vista Ave, Portland 
Sherrard–Fenton House, 13100 SW Riverside Dr, Lake Oswego
Walter S. Zimmerman House, 1840 SW Hawthorne Terrace, Portland

References

People from Independence, Oregon
Architects from Portland, Oregon
1877 births
1961 deaths
Alumni of the Central School of Art and Design